is a term used to distinguish Japan's core land area from its outlying territories. It is most commonly used to distinguish the country's four largest islands (Hokkaidō, Honshū, Kyūshū and Shikoku) from smaller islands such as the Ryukyu Islands and Ogasawara Islands, although depending on the context the term "Mainland Japan" might refer only to Honshū, the largest island.

The term's literal Japanese meaning might best be translated as "inner Japan" or "inner lands". The term "mainland" is somewhat inaccurate since it usually refers to all or part of a continental landmass, rather than islands.

"Mainland Japan" was an official term in the pre-war period, distinguishing Japan proper from its colonies in the Far East (which at that time included parts of mainland Asia). After the end of World War II its usage became less common and lost its previous legal significance.

Historical usage
In the Japanese Empire of the pre-war period, naichi referred to the mainland of the empire. The other territories of the empire was called gaichi (外地, lit. "outer lands").

The Meiji Constitution's Article 1 of the Common Law (共通法) enumerates the territories with legal jurisdictions namely:

Naichi
Naichi (内地, mainland) were the territories under direct control of the government. It consisted of the following:

Karafuto Prefecture (after 1943)
Chishima Islands
Hokkaidō
Honshū
Shikoku
Kyūshū
Izu Islands
Ogasawara Islands
Okinawa
Minor outlying islands around them

Gaichi

These territories were called gaichi (外地, lit. "outer lands"). They were part of the Empire of Japan, but not under direct control by the central government.

 Chōsen (Korea)
 Taiwan 
 Kwantung Province
 Karafuto (until 1943) 
 South Seas Mandate

Although it has never been abolished, the Common Law lost effect from enforcement after Japan lost all the former colonies, or gaichi as a result of World War II.

Modern usage
The residents of Hokkaidō and Okinawa occasionally use naichi to refer to the "mainland", excluding these areas. The colloquial usage is officially "incorrect", as both areas are legally within naichi. In Hokkaidō, the official term that refers to Japan except Hokkaidō is dōgai (lit. outside of Hokkaidō). With dōgai becoming common even in colloquial use, naichi ceases to be used.

The term "main islands" (本島 hontō) is used for Hokkaido, Honshu, Kyushu, Shikoku and Okinawa. The other estimated 6,847 smaller islands are called 'remote islands' (離島 ritō).

See also
Home Islands
Mainland China
China proper

References

Geography of Japan
Japan